Jhum dance is a dance of Tripura, India. It is typically performed by girls and boys.

References

Dances of Tripura